The MyWay card is a form of electronic ticketing used on public transport services within Canberra in the Australian Capital Territory.  It is promoted by Transport Canberra and is valid on Canberra Light Rail and ACTION buses.

The MyWay card uses contactless smart cards with MIFARE technology onto which credit is loaded. Passengers are required to 'tag on' when boarding the bus or entering a light rail station and 'tag off' when exiting, at which point the appropriate fare is calculated and deducted from the stored value on the MyWay card. MyWay cards were made available to ACT Seniors Card-holders on 21 February, 2011 and released to the remainder of the community on 7 March 2011.

The MyWay system uses Parkeon software and equipment including Wayfarer 200 consoles and Axio card readers. The system was built and installed by Parkeon's Australian distributor, Downer EDI. Instead of being developed from scratch, MyWay was adapted from Transperth's SmartRider system which also uses Parkeon hardware and software.

A further 5% discount (for single-trip fares) applies if a MyWay card is topped up using direct debit or BPAY.

The card was issued to the general community including school and tertiary students on 7 March 2011. ACTION's old magnetic strip tickets continued to be valid during a transition period until 11 April 2011. In September 2017, Transport Canberra began looking for a replacement ticketing system to coincide with the opening of the light rail. A contract was scheduled to be awarded in May 2018, however as of January 2021, a contract has yet to have been finalised.

References

Bus transport in Canberra
Contactless smart cards
Fare collection systems in Australia